Cloves Campbell may refer to:
 Cloves Campbell Jr., former American politician
 Cloves Campbell Sr. (1931–2004), American politician and newspaper operator